WDXE (1370 kHz) is a classic country music formatted broadcast radio station licensed to Lawrenceburg, Tennessee, serving Lawrenceburg and Lawrence County, Tennessee. WDXE is owned and operated by Roger Wright, through licensee Radio 7 Media, LLC.

Translators
WDXE's programming is also carried on two broadcast translator stations to extend or improve the coverage area of the station.

References

External links
Classic Country 1370 Online

DXE (AM)
Classic country radio stations in the United States
Radio stations established in 1951
Lawrence County, Tennessee
1951 establishments in Tennessee